The following outline is provided as an overview of and topical guide to Liberia:

Liberia – country in West Africa, bordered by Sierra Leone, Guinea, Côte d'Ivoire, and the Atlantic Ocean.  Liberia has a hot equatorial climate with most rainfall arriving in summer with harsh harmattan winds in the dry season. Liberia's populated Pepper Coast is composed of mostly mangrove forests while the sparse inland is forested, later opening to a plateau of drier grasslands. Since 1989, Liberia has been in a state of flux witnessing two civil wars, the First Liberian Civil War (1989–1996), and the Second Liberian Civil War (1999–2003), displacing hundreds of thousands of people and devastating the country's economy.

General reference 

 Pronunciation: 
 Common English country name:  Liberia
 Official English country name:  The Republic of Liberia
 Common endonym(s):  
 Official endonym(s):  
 Adjectival(s): Liberian
 Demonym(s):
 Etymology: Name of Liberia
 ISO country codes:  LR, LBR, 430
 ISO region codes:  See ISO 3166-2:LR
 Internet country code top-level domain:  .lr

Geography of Liberia 

Geography of Liberia
 Liberia is: a country
 Population of Liberia: 3,750,000  - 129th most populous country
 Area of Liberia: 111,369 km2
 Atlas of Liberia

Location 
 Liberia is situated within the following regions:
 Northern Hemisphere and Western Hemisphere
 Africa
 West Africa
 Time zone:  Coordinated Universal Time UTC+00
 Extreme points of Liberia
 High:  Mount Wuteve 
 Low:  North Atlantic Ocean 0 m
 Land boundaries:  1,585 km
 716 km
 563 km
 306 km
 Coastline:  North Atlantic Ocean 579 km

Environment of Liberia 

 Climate of Liberia
 Wildlife of Liberia
 Fauna of Liberia
 Birds of Liberia
 Mammals of Liberia

Natural geographic features of Liberia 

 Glaciers in Liberia: none 
 Rivers of Liberia
 World Heritage Sites in Liberia: None

Regions of Liberia

Ecoregions of Liberia

Administrative divisions of Liberia 

Administrative divisions of Liberia
 Counties of Liberia
 Districts of Liberia
 Counties of Liberia

Counties of Liberia 

Counties of Liberia

Districts of Liberia 

Districts of Liberia

Clans of Liberia 

Clans of Liberia

Municipalities of Liberia 

 Capital of Liberia: Monrovia
 Cities of Liberia

Demography of Liberia 

Demographics of Liberia

Government and politics of Liberia 

Politics of Liberia
 Form of government: presidential representative democratic republic modeled on the government of the United States
 Capital of Liberia: Monrovia
 Elections in Liberia
 Political parties in Liberia

Branches of the government of Liberia 

Government of Liberia

Executive branch of the government of Liberia 

 Head of state and head of government: President of Liberia, Ellen Johnson Sirleaf
 Vice President of Liberia, Joseph Boakai
 Cabinet of Liberia
 Government ministries of Liberia

Legislative branch of the government of Liberia 

 Parliament of Liberia (bicameral)
 Upper house: Senate of Liberia
 Lower house: House of Representatives of Liberia

Judicial branch of the government of Liberia 

Court system of Liberia
 Supreme Court of Liberia

Foreign relations of Liberia 

Foreign relations of Liberia
 Diplomatic missions in Liberia
 Diplomatic missions of Liberia

International organization membership 
The Republic of Liberia is a member of:

African, Caribbean, and Pacific Group of States (ACP)
African Development Bank Group (AfDB)
African Union (AU)
Economic Community of West African States (ECOWAS)
Food and Agriculture Organization (FAO)
Group of 77 (G77)
International Atomic Energy Agency (IAEA)
International Bank for Reconstruction and Development (IBRD)
International Civil Aviation Organization (ICAO)
International Criminal Court (ICCt)
International Criminal Police Organization (Interpol)
International Development Association (IDA)
International Federation of Red Cross and Red Crescent Societies (IFRCS)
International Finance Corporation (IFC)
International Fund for Agricultural Development (IFAD)
International Labour Organization (ILO)
International Maritime Organization (IMO)
International Mobile Satellite Organization (IMSO)
International Monetary Fund (IMF)
International Olympic Committee (IOC)

International Organization for Migration (IOM)
International Red Cross and Red Crescent Movement (ICRM)
International Telecommunication Union (ITU)
International Trade Union Confederation (ITUC)
Inter-Parliamentary Union (IPU)
Multilateral Investment Guarantee Agency (MIGA)
Nonaligned Movement (NAM)
Organisation for the Prohibition of Chemical Weapons (OPCW)
United Nations (UN)
United Nations Conference on Trade and Development (UNCTAD)
United Nations Educational, Scientific, and Cultural Organization (UNESCO)
United Nations Industrial Development Organization (UNIDO)
Universal Postal Union (UPU)
World Confederation of Labour (WCL)
World Customs Organization (WCO)
World Federation of Trade Unions (WFTU)
World Health Organization (WHO)
World Intellectual Property Organization (WIPO)
World Meteorological Organization (WMO)
World Trade Organization (WTO)

Law and order in Liberia 

Law of Liberia
 Constitution of Liberia
 Human rights in Liberia
 LGBT rights in Liberia
 Law enforcement in Liberia

Military of Liberia 

Military of Liberia
 Command
 Commander-in-chief:
 Forces
 Army of Liberia
 Military history of Liberia

Local government in Liberia

History of Liberia 

History of Liberia
 Military history of Liberia

Culture of Liberia 

Culture of Liberia
 Cuisine of Liberia
 Languages of Liberia
 National symbols of Liberia
 Coat of arms of Liberia
 Flag of Liberia
 National anthem of Liberia
 Prostitution in Liberia
 Public holidays in Liberia
 Religion in Liberia
 Hinduism in Liberia
 Islam in Liberia
 World Heritage Sites in Liberia: None

Art in Liberia 
 Cinema of Liberia
 Music of Liberia

Sports in Liberia 

Sports in Liberia
 Football in Liberia
 Liberia at the Olympics

Economy and infrastructure of Liberia 

Economy of Liberia
 Economic rank, by nominal GDP (2007): 171st (one hundred and seventy first)
 Agriculture in Liberia
 Communications in Liberia
 Internet in Liberia
 Companies of Liberia
Currency of Liberia: Dollar
ISO 4217: LRD
 Energy in Liberia
 Health care in Liberia
 Mining in Liberia
 Tourism in Liberia
 Transport in Liberia
 Airports in Liberia
 Rail transport in Liberia

Education in Liberia 

Education in Liberia

See also 

Liberia
Index of Liberia-related articles
List of international rankings
List of Liberia-related topics
Member state of the United Nations
Outline of Africa
Outline of geography

References

External links 

 allAfrica.com - Liberia news headlines
 
 Liberian Observer newspaper
 Cuttington Chronicle - Student Newspaper of Cuttington University in Suakoko, Liberia
 Cuttington University - Liberia's oldest university
 Johnson-Sirleaf presidential speeches from C-SPAN
 
 
Liberian Law - Cornell Law Library — contains digitized documents dealing with the creation of the nation of Liberia and the laws enacted at its foundation, as well as extensive links for further research

Liberia